The Château de la Calade is a listed château in Aix-en-Provence.

Location
It is located at 1330, chemin du Château-de-la-Calade in Aix-en-Provence, close to Puyricard. It is also not far from the Touloubre river.

History
It was built from 1634 to 1653 for Jérôme de Duranti. The architectural style was archaic on purpose: Jérôme de Duranti had only recently become a member of the aristocracy, and he wanted to look more regal. It only has two stories, with a turret on each side. Inside, the wallpaper named "jardins de Bagatelle" was painted between 1800 and 1804.

Architectural significance
It has been listed as a monument historique since 2011.

Secondary Source
Jean Boyer, Le château de la Calade (Revue municipale, 1981).

References

Calade
Monuments historiques of Aix-en-Provence